Phenylglyoxal is the organic compound with the formula C6H5C(O)C(O)H.  It contains both an aldehyde and a ketone functional group.  It is yellow liquid when anhydrous but readily forms a colorless crystalline hydrate.  It has been used as a reagent to modify the amino acid, arginine. It has also been used to attach chemical payload (probes) to the amino acid citrulline and to peptides/proteins.

Properties
Like some other aldehydes, phenylglyoxal polymerizes upon standing, as indicated by solidification of the liquid.  Upon heating, this polymer "cracks" to give back the yellow aldehyde.  Dissolution of phenylglyoxal in water gives crystals of the hydrate: 
 C6H5C(O)COH  +  H2O   →   C6H5C(O)CH(OH)2
Upon heating, the hydrate loses water and regenerates the anhydrous liquid.

Preparation
Phenylglyoxal was first prepared by thermal decomposition of the sulfite derivative of the oxime:
 C6H5C(O)CH(NOSO2H)  + 2 H2O  →   C6H5C(O)CHO  +  NH4HSO4
More conveniently, it can be prepared from methyl benzoate by reaction with KCH2S(O)CH3 to give PhC(O)CH(SCH3)(OH), which is oxidized with copper(II) acetate.  Alternatively, it can also be prepared by oxidation of acetophenone with selenium dioxide.

References

Aldehydes
Aromatic ketones
Phenyl compounds